The 1987–88 Romanian Hockey League season was the 58th season of the Romanian Hockey League. Four teams participated in the league, and Steaua Bucuresti won the championship.

Regular season

External links
hochei.net

1987–88
Romanian
Rom